Khemaies Jhinaoui (born April 5, 1954) is a Tunisian diplomat who served as Minister of Foreign Affairs of Tunisia from 2016 to 2019. Jhinaoui previously served as Ambassador to Russia and Ukraine from December 2001 to June 2011.

Biography

Khemaies Jhinaoui obtained a degree in public law, a postgraduate degree in public law and a certificate of advanced studies in political science and international relations. In 1978, he obtained a certificate of competence in the legal profession.

In 1979, Jhinaoui began working at the Ministry of Foreign Affairs, where he held numerous positions in the diplomatic corps.

In May 1996, he was sent to Israel to open his country's interest office in Tel Aviv. In January 2006, he was appointed director of political and economic affairs and cooperation with Europe and the European Union in the foreign affairs ministry.

Honours
 2011 : Commander of the Order of the Republic of Tunisia
 2019 : Grand Officier of the Order of the Republic of Tunisia
 2019 : Honorary member of the Xirka Ġieħ ir-Repubblika of Malta

See also
List of foreign ministers in 2017
List of current foreign ministers

References

External links

Tunisian diplomats
1954 births
Living people
Ambassadors of Tunisia to Russia
Ambassadors of Tunisia to Ukraine
Ambassadors of Tunisia to the United Kingdom
Foreign ministers of Tunisia